O11 or O-11 may refer to:
 Curtiss O-11 Falcon, an observation aircraft of the United States Army Air Corps
 , a submarine of the Royal Netherlands Navy
 Oxygen-11, an isotope of oxygen
 Stilwell/Cherokee Nation Airport, in Adair County, Oklahoma, United States
 , a submarine of the United States Navy